Victor Chernozhukov (Виктор Викторович Черножуков) is a Russian-American statistician and economist currently at Massachusetts Institute of Technology. His current research focuses on mathematical statistics and machine learning for causal structural models in high-dimensional environments. He graduated from the University of Illinois at Urbana-Champaign with a master's in statistics in 1997 and received his PhD in economics from Stanford University in 2000.

He is a recipient of The Alfred P. Sloan Research Fellowship and Dissertation Fellowship, The Arnold Zellner Award, and The Bessel Award from the Humboldt Foundation. He delivered the invited Cowles (2009, inaugural), Fisher-Shultz (2019), Hannan (2016), and Sargan (2017) lectures at the Econometric Society Meetings. He served as the inaugural moderator of the new Economics section of ArXiv, which launched in 2017. He was elected fellow by the American Academy of Arts & Sciences, the Econometric Society, and the Institute of Mathematical Statistics

Presentations
Victor Chernozhukov's recent presentations include:

His 2015 presentation - Uniform Post-Selection Inference for LAD Regression and Other Z-Estimation Problems in Seattle. 

His 2015 presentation - Mostly Dangerous Econometrics: How to Do Model Selection with Inference in Mind? in Thessaloniki, Greece. 

His 2015 presentation - Program Evaluation with High-Dimensional Data in Bristol, UK.

Chernozhukov's presentations were primarily based on several mathematical and econometric concepts, such as Uniform Post Selection Inference, Z-Estimation, Treatment Effects, High-Dimensional Data, Central Limit Theorems, and Gaussian Approximations among others.

Papers
Chernozhukov has published papers covering 11 Major themes including Central Limit Theorems and Bootstrap with p>>n, Big Data: Post-Selection Inference for Causal Effects, Big Data: Prediction Methods, High-Dimensional Models, Policy Analysis, Shape Restrictions, Partial Identification and Inference on Sets, Laplacian and Bayesian Inference, Quantiles and Multivariate Quantiles, Endogeneity, and Extremes and Non-Regular Models.

References

Year of birth missing (living people)
Living people
University of Illinois Urbana-Champaign alumni
Stanford University alumni
Massachusetts Institute of Technology faculty
American statisticians
21st-century American economists
Fellows of the American Academy of Arts and Sciences
Fellows of the Econometric Society
Fellows of the Institute of Mathematical Statistics